Poplar Springs is a historic home located near Charles City, Charles City County, Virginia. The original section was built in 1809, and expanded in 1840–1844. It is a -story, three bay, frame dwelling with a center-passage plan. It has a gable roof and brick chimney. It is representative of vernacular Tidewater Virginia architecture.

It was added to the National Register of Historic Places in 1994.

References

Houses completed in 1809
Houses completed in 1844
Houses on the National Register of Historic Places in Virginia
Central-passage houses
Houses in Charles City County, Virginia
National Register of Historic Places in Charles City County, Virginia